"Young Blood" is the second single by American singer Norah Jones from her fourth album, The Fall.

It was released exclusively on February 16, 2010 for North America, Europe (minus the UK) and Japan.

Music video 
The music video was made available at iTunes on 30 March 2010.  Fuse TV named the video its "Video of the Day" on April 9, 2010.

Chart positions

References

Norah Jones songs
2010 singles
Songs written by Norah Jones
2009 songs
Blue Note Records singles
Song recordings produced by Jacquire King